Beach handball is part of the World Games as an invitational sport since the 2001 edition. It has become an official sport of the World Games program since 2013.

Men's tournament
From 2001 to 2009 Beach Handball was contested as a demonstration event. Since the 2013 edition the sport has been formally recognized as part of the World Games program.

Women's tournament
From 2001 to 2009 Beach Handball was contested as a demonstration event. Since the 2013 edition the sport is formally recognized as part of the World Games program.

See also
Beach Handball World Championships

References

 https://web.archive.org/web/20150923221134/http://www.duisburg.de/worldgames_archiv/infosystem/?lang=en  

 
Beach handball at multi-sport events
Beach Handball